The Kwun Yótasi Range is a small subrange of the Swannell Ranges of the Omineca Mountains, located north of Tchentlo Lake and Nation Lakes in northern British Columbia, Canada.

References

Kwun Yótasi Range in the Canadian Mountain Encyclopedia

Swannell Ranges